The Van's RV-6 and RV-6A are two-seat, single-engine, low-wing homebuilt airplanes sold in kit form by Van's Aircraft. The RV-6 is the tail-wheel equipped version while the RV-6A features a nose-wheel. The RV-6 was the first aircraft in the popular Van's RV series to feature side-by-side seating and the first to offer a nosewheel option. It was first flown in 1985. Over 2700 kits have been completed and flown.

The RV-6 and RV-6A were replaced by the similar, but improved, RV-7 in 2001. Kit components are still available to allow builders to complete RV-6s under construction, but no new complete kits are available.

Development

Van's Aircraft designer, Richard VanGrunsven, designed the RV-6 series as a two-seat side-by-side development of the RV-4, which was itself a development of the single seat RV-3.

Market demand motivated VanGrunsven to design the RV-6 and offer it as an optional nosewheel design. The original two seater RV-4 has been a remarkable success, but the tandem seating configuration was not considered ideal by many potential owners as it leaves the passenger isolated in the back seat. Many spouses of builders especially favoured the side-by-side configuration over the tandem arrangement.

VanGrunsven worked diligently to create a side-by-side design with a generous  cockpit that did not sacrifice the RV-4's handling, STOL performance and especially its high cruise speed. In the end the RV-6 prototype produced cruise speeds that are only  slower than the RV-4 with the same engine.

The first RV-6s had a forward hinged canopy design. This was a simple one-piece arrangement, but it made taxiing the aircraft with the canopy open more difficult. Later kits had the option of a rearward sliding canopy that could more easily provide ventilation on the ground. One RV-6A was modified for open cockpit flight with an enclosed rear turtledeck.

The RV-6A version features steel rod landing gear with the nosewheel strut attached to the engine mount. The nosewheel is friction castering and the aircraft is steered with differential braking. The brakes are mounted conventionally on the rudder pedal toes.

Nigerian Air Force RV-6A Air Beetle

The RV-6 has a rare distinction in the world of kit built aircraft – it is used as a military training aircraft. Searching for a suitable trainer that could be assembled in Nigeria using local labour, the government of that country settled on the RV-6A. Van's produced 60 kits to fulfill the order and these were assembled and test flown in Nigeria, entering service with the Nigerian Air Force in 1989 as elementary training aircraft under the name "Air Beetle". The air training school is based at Kaduna, Nigeria. The only other amateur aircraft to have this distinction is the Pazmany PL-1, which was built as a trainer for Taiwan's Air Force in the 1970s.

AVA-202 

A modified version of the RV-6A is manufactured in Iran by Aviation Industries of Iran as the AVA-202.

Operators

Nigerian Air Force (RV-6A)

Specifications (RV-6 180 hp)

See also

References

Lambert, Mark. Jane's All The World's Aircraft 1993–94. Coulsdon, UK:Jane's Data Division, 1993. .
Van's Aircraft Website
Van's Aircraft website – Nigerian Air Force 
International Air Force Directory 1999–2000

External links

Van's Aircraft

Homebuilt aircraft
1980s United States civil utility aircraft
RV-06
Low-wing aircraft
Single-engined tractor aircraft
Aircraft first flown in 1986